Talavera minuta is a species of jumping spider in the family Salticidae. It is found in Russia, Canada, and the United States.

References

Further reading

 

Salticidae
Articles created by Qbugbot
Spiders described in 1895
Taxa named by Nathan Banks